Nikolay Pavlovich Ushmaev (born 13 May 1946) is the legendary man of the Soviet classical parachuting and a pioneer of paragliding in the USSR. The first in the history of parachuting became a two-time absolute world champion. He participated in nine world parachuting championships, where he became world champion nine times.
 Nikolay made over 13,000+ parachute jumps, and set 33 world records and 55 Soviet Union records in parachuting. The only 5-time world champion in aerial acrobatics and the only Soviet parachutist represented USSR at the opening of the Olympics in Seoul in 1988.

Nikolay won the gold medal in Men's Overall Individual Style and Accuracy at the XV World Parachuting Championships in Kazanlak, Bulgaria in 1980, and the gold medal in Men's Overall Individual Style and Accuracy at the XII World Parachuting Championships in Szolnok, Hungary in 1974
 Triple All-round USSR Champion;
 Honoured Master of Sports of the USSR.

References

External links
 

1946 births
Living people
Russian skydivers
Honoured Masters of Sport of the USSR